Club Sportif Orne 1919 Amnéville-les-Thermes is a French association football team founded in 1919. They are based in Amnéville, France and are playing in the sixth tier in the French football league system. They play at the Stade André Valentin in Amnéville.

In the summer of 2017 the club had a controversial dispute with the French Football Federation after being denied promotion for financial reasons. They were eventually admitted to the Championnat National 3 a month into the season, having already played games in the regional league.

Current squad

External links

References

Association football clubs established in 1919
1919 establishments in France
Sport in Moselle (department)
Football clubs in Grand Est